Awqa Pallqa (Aymara and Quechua awqa enemy, pallqa bifurcation, "enemy's bifurcation", also spelled Aucapallca) is a mountain in the Andes of Peru which reaches an altitude of approximately . It is located in the Lima Region, Huarochirí Province, Carampoma District. Awqa Pallqa lies west of Wamanripayuq.

References

Mountains of Peru
Mountains of Lima Region